Eddie Richard Snead (July 30, 1910 – August 26, 1975) was an American Negro league pitcher in the 1940s.

A native of Fowl River, Alabama, Snead played for the Birmingham Black Barons in 1940. In eight recorded games on the mound, he posted a 3.83 ERA over 40 innings. Snead died in Mobile, Alabama in 1975 at age 65.

References

External links
 and Seamheads

1910 births
1975 deaths
Birmingham Black Barons players
Baseball pitchers
Baseball players from Alabama
People from Mobile County, Alabama
20th-century African-American sportspeople